Club RC Morales 1128 Sport was a football club that played in the Liga TDP. It was based in the city of Ocotlán, Mexico.

History
The club was founded in 2020 as a professional team for footballers of a soccer academy belonging to the brothers Ramón and Carlos Adrián Morales, which is also supported by Carlos Salcido, so the name of the club comes from the initials and numbers used by the Morales brothers in their time as professional footballers.

The team finished its first season in fourth place in Group 11 and thus entered the promotion play-offs. In the early stages, the club eliminated Catedráticos Élite, CEFUT and Mazorqueros to reach the zone semifinals. In this phase, the team eliminated Delfines de Abasolo in a penalty shoot-out, in this way, the club achieved its promotion to the Liga Premier de México. On June 27, the team was crowned champion of North Zone of the Liga TDP after defeating Deportivo CAFESSA Tlajomulco by an aggregate score of 4–5, with this the club secured its place in the Serie A de México.

In July 2021 the team was merged with Catedráticos Élite F.C.and took the identity of this club, so it was relocated in Ameca. After this merger, RC–1128 ceased to exist as such, since it was not registered in the new season of the Liga TDP.

Stadium
The team plays its home games at the Estadio Municipal Benito Juárez de Ocotlán, which has a capacity for 1,500 spectators. Originally, the team started playing at the Complejo Deportivo Salcido, however, in May 2021 it moved from the stadium.

Players

First-team squad

References 

Football clubs in Jalisco
Association football clubs established in 2020
2020 establishments in Mexico